Jalen Davis (born February 2, 1996) is an American football cornerback for the Cincinnati Bengals of the National Football League (NFL). He played college football at Utah State.

Early life and high school
Davis was born in Hawaii, but grew up in La Mesa, California and attended Helix High School. At Helix, Davis played both cornerback and wide receiver and returned kicks and punts for the Scotties. As a senior, he was named the Grossmont Conference Defensive Player of the Year after making 45 tackles and was also first-team all-conference on offense after catching 48 passes for 649 yards and four touchdowns with four punts and two kickoffs returned for touchdowns.

College career
Davis played four seasons for the Utah State Aggies, who were the only FBS school to offer him a scholarship. As a senior, Davis intercepted five passes, three of which he returned for a touchdown, with 12 passes broken up and held quarterbacks to a passer rating of 30.5 when targeted. At the end of the season he was named first-team All-Mountain West Conference and a Walter Camp Foundation First-team All-American and a second-team All-American by The Associated Press and the Football Writers Association of America (FWAA). Over the course of his collegiate career, Davis played in 48 games accumulated 181 tackles with 37 pass deflections and 11 interceptions, four of which he returned for touchdowns.

Professional career

Miami Dolphins
Davis signed with the Miami Dolphins as an undrafted free agent on April 30, 2018. He was cut from the team at the end of the preseason and subsequently re-signed to the team's practice squad on September 2, 2018. Davis was promoted to the Dolphins' active roster on December 8, 2018. Davis made his NFL debut on December 9, 2018 in a 34-33 win over the New England Patriots. Davis made his first career tackle, a sack, and forced a fumble against the Jacksonville Jaguars on December 23, 2018. He was released by the Dolphins during final roster cuts on August 31, 2019.

Arizona Cardinals
Davis was signed to the Arizona Cardinals practice squad on September 3, 2019. He was promoted to the active roster on December 7, 2019.

On August 31, 2020, Davis was waived by the Cardinals. He was re-signed to the Cardinals practice squad on September 16, 2020. He was released on October 20.

Cincinnati Bengals
On October 27, 2020, Davis was signed to the Cincinnati Bengals practice squad. He was elevated to the active roster on November 14 and November 21 for the team's weeks 10 and 11 games against the Pittsburgh Steelers and Washington Football Team, and reverted to the practice squad after each game. He was promoted to the active roster on November 28, 2020.

Davis signed a one-year contract extension with the Bengals on March 3, 2021.

On March 9, 2023, Davis signed a two-year contract extension with the Bengals.

References

External links
Utah State Aggies bio
Miami Dolphins bio
College statistics at Sports-Reference.com

1996 births
Living people
American football cornerbacks
Miami Dolphins players
People from La Mesa, California
Players of American football from California
Sportspeople from San Diego County, California
Utah State Aggies football players
Arizona Cardinals players
Cincinnati Bengals players